Innisfail Aerodrome (Big Bend Airport)  is located beside Alberta Highway 54,  northwest of Innisfail, Alberta, Canada.

The aerodrome, managed by the Innisfail Flying Club since 1986, offers one asphalt runway (16/34) equipped with night landing lights. The two other runway surfaces (04/22 & 10/28), used during World War II, are in rough condition. There are several hangars at the aerodrome and room for more development. It is host to many activities year-round, including a glider club, the Innisfail Flying Club and a skydiving training facility.

History
The aerodrome was opened in 1941 as a relief landing field for the Royal Canadian Air Force as part of the British Commonwealth Air Training Plan. Under the direction of General Robert Murray its primary purpose was a training facility for the No. 36 Service Flying Training School (SFTS) located at RCAF Station Penhold.

Three runways were listed as follows:

Activities

Innisfail Flying Club
The Innisfail Flying Club holds monthly meetings on the third Thursday of every month. The current club President is Shane Cockreill.

The Central Alberta Gliding & Soaring Club
The Central Alberta Gliding & Soaring Club is active, and operates gliders at Innisfail on weekends during the summer.

Alberta Skydive Central
Alberta Skydive Central offers experienced tandem and IAD instructors.

References

External links
Central Alberta Gliding Club
Alberta Skydive Central
Place to Fly on COPA's Places to Fly airport directory

Registered aerodromes in Alberta
Red Deer County
Innisfail, Alberta